The Women's shot put event  at the 2004 IAAF World Indoor Championships was held on March 5.

Medalists

Note: Vita Pavlysh had originally won the gold but was later stripped off it for the use of anabolic steroids.

Results

Qualification
Qualifying performance 18.50 (Q) or 8 best performers (q) advanced to the final.

Final

References
Results

Shot
Shot put at the World Athletics Indoor Championships
2004 in women's athletics